Lobophytum varium is a coral species of the genus Lobophytum.

References 

Alcyoniidae